Romance on the Run is a 1938 American comedy crime film directed by Gus Meins and starring Donald Woods and Patricia Ellis.

Plot 

A very expensive necklace known as the "Czarina's Tears" is stolen from Phelps' jewelry shop. The next morning, Phelps (Granville Bates) goes to see insurance company manager J. W. Ridgeway (Andrew Tombes). Ridgeway is certain Phelps' policy was not renewed, but his young secretary, Miss Dale Harrison (Patricia Ellis), informs him she renewed it while he was away.

Lieutenant Eckhart (William Demarest) wants Ridgeway to leave the case entirely to the police, but Ridgeway hires private investigator Drake (Donald Woods). Drake suspects nightclub singer Lily Lamont (Grace Bradley). Drake introduces Lily to safecracker Charlie Cooper (Craig Reynolds) at the nightclub. They pretend they do not know each other, but they do.

Drake breaks into Cooper's apartment to search for the necklace. Cooper discovers him and holds him at gunpoint, but Drake manages to disarm him and find the necklace. He collects his fee of $10,000, which disgusts Eckhart, who suspects Drake is involved in all the robberies he solves. Phelps shows up to retrieve his necklace, but quickly realizes it is only an imitation. Drake is told the bad news by his sidekick Whitey Whitehouse.

Drake and Whitey rush to the train station (Drake found train tickets in Cooper's apartment) and spot Lily. Meanwhile, Miss Harris also arrives, trying to catch Ridgeway before he leaves on a business trip. Seeing Drake, she follows him to Cincinnati. On the way, she notifies Eckhart by telegram.

In Cincinnati, Lily and Cooper visit fence Mondoon, but the necklace is too dangerous for him to handle. When Drake and Whitey show up, a chase ensues; Drake ends up with the crooks' car - and Lily's suitcase, which contains the jewelry. Now the thieves, as well as Eckhart, pursue Drake, Whitey and Gale, who head to New Orleans (and another fence) in search of the crooks. Drake's trio run out of gas in the middle of nowhere. They see a house and encounter a family of hillbillies. One of the children finds the necklace in a jar of face cream, witnessed only by Gale. Gale takes the necklace and, after trying repeatedly to tell Drake, gives up and hitches a ride, while Eckhart arrests the other four.

Back at the office, Gale switches the fake necklace with the real one, bailing Drake out of trouble. Drake makes an appointment with her at the city hall, implying they are going to get married.

Cast 
Donald Woods as Barry Drake
Patricia Ellis as Dale Harrison
Grace Bradley as Lily Lamont
Edward Brophy as Whitey Whitehouse
William Demarest as Lieutenant Eckhart
Craig Reynolds as Charlie Cooper
Andrew Tombes as J. W. Ridgeway
Bert Roach as Happy Drunk
Leon Weaver as Pappy Hatfield
Edwin Maxwell as Mondoon
Granville Bates as Mr. Phelps
Jean Joyce as Dolly
Georgia Simmons as Ma Hatfield

References

External links 

1938 films
American black-and-white films
American romantic comedy films
American crime comedy films
American comedy mystery films
Films directed by Gus Meins
Films set in Cincinnati
Republic Pictures films
Films with screenplays by Jack Townley
1930s comedy mystery films
1938 romantic comedy films
1930s English-language films
1930s American films